Birla Precision Technologies Limited is an Indian engineering company. Company established in 1937, leading in various fields.

Birla Precision Tech has 5 divisions, spread over 4 factories. It is mainly in the auto component and industrial engineering domain. The company exports to more than 25 countries. It is listed on the BSE Stock Exchange. The chairman & managing director of the company is Vedant Birla.

Birla Precision is a part of Yash Birla Group. Earlier JVs made in the group include Birla Yamaha, Birla 3M, Birla Kennametal, Birla Perucchini, Birla Delonghi, Dagger Forst, South Pacific Viscose, etc.

Major customers of the companies include Cummins, Honeywell, government engineering companies, defence, and aerospace.

References

Yash Birla Group
Indian brands
Manufacturing companies based in Mumbai
Indian companies established in 1937
Manufacturing companies established in 1937
Companies listed on the Bombay Stock Exchange